The adzebills, genus Aptornis, were two closely related bird species, the North Island adzebill, (Aptornis otidiformis), and the South Island adzebill, (Aptornis defossor), of the extinct family Aptornithidae. The family was endemic to New Zealand. A fossil species, (Aptornis proasciarostratus), is known from the Miocene Saint Bathans fauna.

Taxonomy
They have been placed in the Gruiformes but this is not entirely certain. It was also proposed to ally them with the Galloanserae. Studies of morphology and DNA sequences place them variously close to and far off from the kagu of New Caledonia,  as well as the trumpeters. However, on first discovery of fossils, they were mistaken for ratites, specifically small moa. Its morphological closeness to the kagu may be the result of convergent evolution, although New Zealand's proximity to New Caledonia and shared biological affinities (the two islands are part of the same microcontinent) has led some researchers to suggest they share a common ancestor from Gondwana. The Gondwanan sunbittern is the closest living relative of the kagu, but these are not close to the Gruiformes proper (i.e. cranes, rails and allies).

A 2011 genetic study found A. defossor to be a gruiform. There are no available DNA sequences for A. otidiformis, but it was assumed the two species were more closely related to each other than to other birds.

In 2019 two studies came forth with more in-depth phylogenetic methods. The first from Boast et al. (2019) using data from near-complete mitochondrial genome sequences found adzebills to be closely related to the family Sarothruridae, the flufftails. Shortly after another study by Musser and Cracraft (2019), using both morphological and molecular data, found support for adzebills to be closely related to trumpeters of the family Psophiidae instead. The authors took account of Boast et al. (2019) dataset and found it took 18 more steps to support the Aptornithidae-Sarothruridae clade than for Aptornithidae-Psophiidae.

Description
The adzebills were about 80 cm in length with a weight of 18 kg, making them about the size of small moa (with which they were initially confused on their discovery) with enormous downward-curving and pointed bill, and strong legs. They were flightless and had extremely reduced wings, smaller than those of the dodo compared to the birds' overall size, and with a uniquely reduced carpometacarpus.

The two species varied mostly in size with the North Island adzebill being the smaller species; their coloration in life is not known however.

Habitat and behaviour

Their fossils have been found in the drier areas of New Zealand, and only in the lowlands. Richard Owen, who described the two species, speculated that it was an omnivore, and analysis of its bones by stable isotope analysis supports this. Levels of enrichment in 13C and 15N for two specimens of Aptornis otidiformis compared with values for a moa, Finsch's duck and insectivores like the owlet-nightjars suggested that the adzebill ate species higher in the food chain than insectivores. They are thought to have fed on large invertebrates, lizards, tuataras and even small birds.

Extinction
The adzebills were never as widespread as the moa, but subjected to the same hunting pressure as these and other large birds by the settling Polynesians (and predation of eggs/hatchlings by accompanying Polynesian rats and dogs). They became extinct before the arrival of European explorers.

References
 
 
 
 
 Worthy, Trevor H., & Holdaway, Richard N. (2002) The Lost World of the Moa, Indiana University Press:Bloomington, 
 North Island Adzebill. Aptornis otidiformis. by Paul Martinson. Artwork produced for the book Extinct Birds of New Zealand, by Alan Tennyson, Te Papa Press, Wellington, 2006
 South Island Adzebill. Aptornis defossor. by Paul Martinson. Artwork produced for the book Extinct Birds of New Zealand, by Alan Tennyson, Te Papa Press, Wellington, 2006

Footnotes

Neognathae
Extinct flightless birds
Extinct birds of New Zealand
Higher-level bird taxa restricted to New Zealand
Late Quaternary prehistoric birds
Holocene extinctions
Taxa named by Richard Owen
Fossil taxa described in 1844
Birds described in 1844